Totoma (also, To-to and Totu) is a former Maidu settlement in Butte County, California. It was located on the east side of the north branch of Feather River about midway between Yankee and Hengy; its precise location is unknown.

References

Former settlements in Butte County, California
Former Native American populated places in California
Lost Native American populated places in the United States
Maidu villages